Pastor Edmund Kayser of St. James' Evangelical Lutheran Church in Tolleston, Indiana, was assassinated on August 25, 1916, for his pro-German views during World War I.

Background

World War I had started on July 28, 1914, when the Austro-Hungarian Empire declared war on Serbia. By 1916, nearly all of the European nations and empires had entered the war. The United States maintained its neutrality, and some of its sizeable German population supported Imperial Germany and its Axis of Central Powers that was fighting the Entente Powers. In the 1910 census there were 2.3 million German-born immigrants living in the United States and 550 German newspapers in the country. The large number of German-Americans was also a factor in keeping America out of World War I until the fighting had been going on for three years.

Early life

Edmund Kayser was born in Bavaria. He moved to the United States and established an independent Lutheran church that paid him $50 ($ in ) a month. It was said that he had other sources of income buying and selling land.

Murder

Kayser's St. James' Lutheran Church was based in Tolleston, a suburb of Gary, Indiana. His community had a number of German immigrants, some of whom supported Imperial Germany and its Axis of Central Powers, along with a number of Slavic immigrants who favored Russia and its Entente Powers allies. During his sermons, he would often anger people by espousing pro-German views. Threats against his life had gotten so bad that members of his church had to escort him from the church to his home. 

Late one night, Kayser was confronted by several people in the study of his house. His wife and two daughters were visiting family in Grand Rapids, Michigan. Police say that broken furniture in the study showed that Kayser had put up a fight before he was subdued. He was bound by a cord, carried out, shot, and dumped in some bushes near his house. The gunshot wounds were to his chest and his jugular vein. Police were able to determine that no valuables or money had been taken from his house. His body was found an hour later by one August Schultz and his wife. Medical examiners later determined that he had bled out from his neck wound.

The postmaster, Snyder, entered the case when it was revealed that a woman had sent him a threatening letter to stay away from a woman in Gary, Mrs. Mary Krause. Krause denied any type of relationship with Kayser. Chief of Police Heinz ordered police to interview the Gary woman. The letters had many threats such as "Move away or dynamite will move"; another read: "Before the leaves turn you will be stretched on the ground."

George Schneider, a member of the Gary Saxon Terien, was named as a suspect after he revealed that he had gotten in a fight the same night Kayser was killed, with bruises and scratches on his face.

See also
Opposition to World War I
German Americans

Bibliography 
Notes

References 

 - Total pages: 354 

1916 murders in the United States
20th-century American Lutheran clergy
Anti-German sentiment in the United States
American anti–World War I activists
Bavarian emigrants to the United States
Deaths by firearm in Indiana
Hate crimes
Lutheranism in Indiana
Lynching deaths in Indiana
People murdered in Indiana
Racially motivated violence against European Americans
1875 births
1916 deaths